Gin Gin may refer to:

 Gin Gin, Queensland, a town in the Bundaberg Region, Australia
 Gin Gin, New South Wales

See also

 Gingin, Western Australia
 Shire of Gingin, Western Australia
 RAAF Gingin, Western Australia, a military airfield